Eucalyptus dunnii, commonly known as Dunn's white gum or simply white gum, is a species of medium-sized to tall tree that is endemic to eastern Australia. It has rough bark near the base, smooth white to cream-coloured bark above, lance-shaped to curved adult leaves, flower buds in groups of seven, white flowers and cup-shaped, conical or hemispherical fruit.

Description
It has rough, greyish, corky, fibrous or flaky bark on the lower part of the trunk, smooth white or grey bark above that is shed in short ribbons.

Taxonomy and naming
Eucalyptus dunnii was first described in 1905 by Joseph Maiden in Proceedings of the Linnean Society of New South Wales from a specimen collected by William Dunn at "Acacia Creek, Macpherson Range". The specific epithet (dunnii) honours the collector of the type specimen.

Distribution and habitat
Dunn's white gum has a scattered and restricted distribution in wet forest north from Dorrigo and Coffs Harbour in New South Wales to Warwick and Canungra in Queensland.

References

dunnii
Myrtales of Australia
Flora of New South Wales
Trees of Australia
Plants described in 1905
Taxa named by Joseph Maiden